William Simone Di Piero is an American poet, translator, essayist, and educator. He has published ten collections of poetry and five collections of essays in addition to his translations. In 2012 Di Piero received the Ruth Lilly Poetry Prize for his lifetime achievement; in making the award, Christian Wiman noted, "He’s a great poet whose work is just beginning to get the wide audience it deserves."

Life
He grew up in an Italian working-class neighborhood, attended St. Joseph's College in Philadelphia and received a master's degree from San Francisco State University in 1971.

He taught at Louisiana State University, and Northwestern University. In 1982, he joined Stanford University.  He is an art critic, and curated a photography exhibit of Jonathan Elderfield.

His work appeared in AGNI, Ploughshares, and Triquarterly.

He lives in San Francisco.

Awards
 2012 Ruth Lilly Poetry Prize for lifetime achievement.
 2008 California Book Award. Gold medal for Chinese Apples: New and Selected Poems.
 1998–2001 Lila Wallace-Reader's Digest Fund grant.
 1996 Academy of American Poets Raiziss/de Palchi Translation Award. Book prize for This Strange Joy: Selected Poems of Sandro Penna.
 1985 Guggenheim Fellowship.
 Ingram Merrill Fellowship.
 National Endowment for the Arts grant.

Works

Poetry collections
 The Complaints. Carnegie Mellon University Press; February 15, 2019
 The Man on the Water. MadHat Press; December 15, 2016

 
 
 
 
 

 Country of Survivors: Poems. Eric B. Rasmussen Publishing. 1974.

Journal contributions

Translations

Essays
 Fat: New and Uncollected Prose. Carnegie Mellon University Press; November 7, 2020
City Dog, Northwestern University Press, 2009.

Anthologies

References

Further reading
  Not available online.
 
  Question and answer session.
 Chinese Apples: Poems by W.S. Di Piero August 27, 2008, The Leonard Lopate Show: WNYC
 W.S. Di Piero, August 17, 2001, Morning Edition: NPR

Online poetry

 Links to several poems and articles by Di Piero.

1945 births
Living people
American male poets
Writers from Philadelphia
Greek–English translators
Italian–English translators
20th-century American poets
20th-century American translators
20th-century American male writers
20th-century American essayists
21st-century American poets
21st-century American translators
21st-century American male writers
21st-century American essayists
American male essayists
Saint Joseph's University alumni
San Francisco State University alumni
Louisiana State University faculty
Northwestern University faculty
Stanford University faculty